Zijtaart is a village in the south of the Netherlands. It is situated in the municipality of Meierijstad, North Brabant. As of January 2015 it has a population of 1,727.

History
Zijtaart as a church village was officially founded in 1872 when it split off as a separate parish from the St. Lambert Parish in Veghel. The church of the Zijtaart St. Lambert Parish still bears the original tower cross atop the spire, of the old St. Lambert Church of Veghel. The tower cross was presented as a gift by the St. Lambert Parish of Veghel in 1873, which would start the demolition of its old church that following year, because of the completion of a new and larger church.

Gallery

References

External links
 Website of Zijtaart
 History of the village of Zijtaart

Populated places in North Brabant
Meierijstad